Cyrtochites is a genus of taxonomically-problematic tooth-shaped small shelly fossil reconstructed as the jaw of a predatory organism.

References

Cambrian invertebrates
Enigmatic prehistoric animal genera
Fossils of China